Michael or Mike Brown may refer to:

Academics
 Michael Barratt Brown (1918–2015), British economist, political activist and educator
 Michael Brown (physicist) (born 1946), Vice-Chancellor of Liverpool John Moores University
 Michael E. Brown (academic) (born 1954), American international affairs professor
 Michael Brown (historian) (born 1965), Scottish historian

Arts and entertainment
 Michael Brown (writer), (1920–2014), American composer, lyricist, writer, director, producer, and performer
 Michael Napier Brown (1937–2016), British actor, theatre director and playwright
 Mike Brown (artist) (1938–1997), Australian artist who worked with Vivienne Binns in the 1990s
 Michael Brown (rock musician) (1949–2015), American keyboardist and songwriter
 Michael Ealy (Michael Brown, born 1973), American actor
 Michael Brown (film director) (born 1978), American documentary filmmaker
 Michael Christopher Brown (born 1978), American photographer
 Mike Brown (producer) (born 1980), American music producer, engineer, songwriter, and multi-instrumentalist
 Michael Brown (pianist) (born 1987), American classical pianist and composer
 Mike Brown (saxophonist), saxophonist of Streetlight Manifesto

Politics and law

United States
 Michael J. Brown (born 1941), Illinois state representative and businessman
 Michael Donald Brown (born 1953), American shadow senator for the District of Columbia
 Michael D. Brown (born 1954), American head of FEMA; resigned after Hurricane Katrina
 Michael A. Brown (Washington, D.C., politician) (born 1965), At-Large Member of the Council of the District of Columbia
 Michael Lawrence Brown (born 1968), American federal judge in Georgia
 G. Michael Brown (fl. 1990s), American lawyer and former New Jersey gaming regulator
 Michael Brown (Michigan politician) (fl. 2009), Flint City, Michigan administrator and temporary mayor
 Michael Brown (mayor) (fl. 2000–2020), mayor of Grand Forks, North Dakota

Other countries
 Michael A. Brown (Canadian politician) (born 1950), Canadian Liberal politician, Speaker of the Ontario legislature
 Michael Brown (British politician) (born 1951), British Conservative MP and political journalist
 Michael Brown (Australian politician), member of the South Australian House of Assembly
 Mick Brown (judge) (Michael Brown) (1937–2015), New Zealand judge

Religion
 Michael Brown (English priest) (1915–2004), Archdeacon of Nottingham
 Michael Brown (New Zealand priest) (born 1936), New Zealand Anglican priest
 Michael L. Brown (born 1955), conservative American Messianic Jewish radio host and scholar

Science and medicine
 Michael Brown (physician) (1931–1993), British physician, Director of Army Medicine and Physician to the Queen
 Michael Stuart Brown (born 1941), American Nobel Prize-winning biologist
 Michael F. Brown (born 1948), American professor of chemistry
 Michael Glyn Brown (1957–2013), American hand surgeon
 Michael E. Brown (born 1965), American astronomer and discoverer of dwarf planets Eris, Haumea, and Makemake

Sports

American football 
 Mike Brown (American football executive) (born 1935), owner of the Cincinnati Bengals
 Mike Brown (safety) (born 1978), American football player
 Mike Brown (wide receiver) (born 1989), American football player
 Mike Brown (defensive back, born 1999), American football player

Association football 
 Michael Brown (footballer, born 1951), Welsh footballer
 Mickey Brown (born 1968), English footballer for Shrewsbury Town
 Michael Brown (footballer, born 1977), English footballer for Port Vale F.C.
 Michael Brown (footballer, born 1985), English footballer for Chester City

Baseball 
 Mike Brown (Negro leagues outfielder) (fl. 1905–1914), American Negro league baseball player
 Mike Brown (1980s outfielder) (born 1959), American MLB outfielder for Pittsburgh Pirates and California Angels
 Mike Brown (pitcher) (born 1959), American MLB pitcher for Boston Red Sox and Seattle Mariners

Basketball 
 Mike Brown (basketball, born 1963), American former professional basketball player and coach
 Mike Brown (basketball, born 1970), American basketball coach

Ice hockey 
 Mike Brown (ice hockey, born 1957), American ice hockey player
 Mike Brown (ice hockey, born 1979), Canadian NHL forward
 Mike Brown (ice hockey, born 1981), Canadian ice hockey goaltender
 Mike Brown (ice hockey, born 1985), American NHL forward

Other sports
 Michael Brown (canoeist) (born 1937), Canadian sprint canoer
 Michael Brown (tennis) (born 1971), Australian tennis player
 Mike Brown (motorcyclist) (born 1972), American national champion motocross racer
 Mike Brown (fighter) (born 1975), American mixed martial arts fighter
 Michael Brown (Australian rules footballer) (born 1976), Australian rules footballer
 Michael Brown (cricketer) (born 1980), English cricketer
 Mike Brown (swimmer) (born 1984), Canadian Olympic swimmer
 Mike Brown (rugby union) (born 1985), English rugby union player
 Michael Brown (chess player) (born 1997), American chess player

Others
 Mike Brown (transport executive) (born 1964), Commissioner of Transport for London
 Michael Brown (fraudster) (born 1966), Scottish businessman convicted of perjury
 Michael Brown (corporate executive), American corporate executive

Other uses 
 Michael Brown Okinawa assault incident, 2002 incident in which an American Marine was convicted of assault
 Shooting of Michael Brown, 2014 incident in which a teenager was shot and killed by a police officer in Ferguson, Missouri

See also
 Mick Brown (disambiguation)
 Michael Browne (disambiguation)